Anthidium edwardsii is a species of bee in the family Megachilidae, the leaf-cutter, carder, or mason bees.

Synonyms
Synonyms for this species include:
Anthidium tricuspidum Provancher, 1896
Anthidium hesperium Swenk, 1914
Anthidium depressum Schwarz, 1927

References

External links
Images

edwardsii
Insects described in 1878
Taxa named by Ezra Townsend Cresson